The Monastery of Ntra. Sra. de la Piedad (Spanish: Monasterio de Ntra. Sra. de la Piedad) is a monastery located in Casalarreina, Spain. It was declared Bien de Interés Cultural in 1977.

References 

Bien de Interés Cultural landmarks in La Rioja (Spain)